Dominique Gisin (born 4 June 1985) is a retired World Cup alpine ski racer and Olympic gold medalist from Switzerland. She is the older sister of alpine ski racers Marc and Michelle Gisin.

Career
Born in Visp in the canton of Valais, Gisin made her World Cup debut in December 2005. Her first podium was in Altenmarkt-Zauchensee, Austria, where she placed second in the downhill on 13 January 2007. Two years later in January 2009, she gained her first World Cup victory, also a downhill at Altenmarkt-Zauchensee, with the same time as Anja Pärson.

At the Winter Olympics in 2014, she tied for first in the downhill with Tina Maze and both were awarded gold medals. It was the first-ever tie for gold in an alpine event at the Olympics, though several times previously competitors have tied for second, so that two silver medals were awarded (and no bronze). As a result, Gisin was named as Swiss Sportswoman of the Year for 2014.

Through March 2014, Gisin has 3 World Cup victories, 7 podiums, and 42 top ten finishes. Her younger siblings Marc and Michelle also compete as alpine ski racers.

In March 2015 Gisin announced her retirement from competition at the World Cup Finals meeting at Méribel.

Away from skiing, Gisin learned to fly as a teenager and joined the Swiss Air Force to train as a fighter pilot, before being released due to knee injuries incurred through her skiing career.

World Cup results

Season standings

Race podiums
3 wins – (2 DH, 1 SG)
7 podiums – (5 DH, 2 SG)

World Championship results

Olympic results

See also
List of Olympic medalist families

References

External links

 
 Dominique Gisin World Cup standings at the International Ski Federation
 
 
  home page – 
 Swiss Ski team – official site – 
 Dynastar Skis – Dominique Gisin

1985 births
Swiss female alpine skiers
Alpine skiers at the 2010 Winter Olympics
Alpine skiers at the 2014 Winter Olympics
Olympic alpine skiers of Switzerland
Medalists at the 2014 Winter Olympics
Olympic medalists in alpine skiing
Olympic gold medalists for Switzerland
People from Obwalden
Living people
21st-century Swiss women